This is a list of bridges in Chongqing, China.

Bridges

Baishatuo Railway Bridge
Beidong Bridge
Caiyuanba Bridge
Changshou Bridge
Changshou Railway Bridge
Chaotianmen Bridge
Chaoyang Arch Bridge
Dafosi Bridge
Daning River Bridge
Dingshan Bridge
Dragon’s Gate bridge
Diwei Bridge
Dongshuimen Bridge
Dongyang Bridge
Egongyan Bridge
Fengdu Bridge
Fengjie Bridge
Fuling Arch Bridge
Fuling Wujiang Bridge
Fuling Yangtze River Bridge
Furongjiang River Bridge
Guangyangdao Bridge
Guanyinyan Bridge
Hanjiatuo Bridge
Hechuan Jialingjiang Bridge
Huanghuayuan Bridge
Jia Yue Bridge
Jiangjin Bridge
Jiahua Bridge
Lidu Bridge
Lijiatuo Bridge
Masangxi Bridge
Meixi River Bridge
Meixi River Expressway Bridge
New Dragon’s Gate bridge
Qianximen Bridge
Shibangou Bridge
Second Wanxian Bridge
Shibanpo Bridge
Shimen Bridge
Shuitu Bridge
Taichang Bridge
Wanxian Bridge
Wanzhou Railway Bridge
Wulingshan Bridge
Wushan Yangtze River Bridge
Xisha Bridge
Yangjialing Bridge
Yingbin Yangtze River Bridge under construction
Yongchuan Bridge
Yudong Bridge
Yunyang Yangtze River Bridge
Yuzui Yangtze River Bridge
Zhongxian Huyu Expressway Bridge
Zhongxian Yangtze River Bridge

See also
List of bridges in China
Yangtze River bridges and tunnels

References

Chongqing
Chongqing-related lists
Chongqing